The Opheim–West Poplar River Border Crossing connects the town of Opheim, Montana with Rockglen, Saskatchewan on the Canada–United States border. It is reached by Montana Highway 24 on the American side and Saskatchewan Highway 2 on the Canadian side.

The crossing is among the 10 least-used on the border. It is so remote that border officials live in housing next to each country's stations. In 2004, the US replaced its small border station with a large facility.  Canada replaced its border station at West Poplar River in 2015.

See also
 List of Canada–United States border crossings

References

Canada–United States border crossings
Geography of Saskatchewan
1917 establishments in Montana
1917 establishments in Saskatchewan
Buildings and structures in Valley County, Montana
Transportation in Valley County, Montana